Theoretical economic geography is a branch of economic geography concerned with understanding the spatial distribution of economic activity.

Theoretical techniques in this branch of economics explain a number of phenomena such as:

The clustering of people and businesses into cities.
The location of major population centers, which is often based on proximity to trade routes. For example, most major cities are located on harbours.
The distribution of people and businesses within cities with higher density in the centres, reducing to lower density on the fringes.
The distribution of populations across land masses, with major cities, interspersed with regional centres which are in turn interspersed with smaller towns. 
The clustering of similar businesses together.

References

Economic geography
Regional economics